Matthew Rankin is a Canadian experimental filmmaker. He is most noted for his feature-length debut,  The Twentieth Century, which premiered in 2019 and was nominated for eight Canadian Screen Awards, winning three.

He has also received acolades for his 2014 film Mynarski Death Plummet, which was a shortlisted Canadian Screen Award nominee for Best Live Action Short Drama at the 4th Canadian Screen Awards and a shortlisted Jutra Award nominee for Best Short Film at the 17th Jutra Awards, and his 2017 film The Tesla World Light, which won the Canadian Screen Award for Best Animated Short at the 6th Canadian Screen Awards and received an Honourable Mention for the Toronto International Film Festival Award for Best Canadian Short Film at the 2017 Toronto International Film Festival.

Originally from Winnipeg, Manitoba, he studied history at McGill University and Université Laval.

He has also had occasional small acting roles in other directors' films, most recently the 2022 films This House (Cette maison) and Before I Change My Mind.

Filmography
Le facteur poulpe - 2005
Où est Maurice? - 2006
I Dream of Driftwood - 2008
Sharhé-Halé Shakhsi: M. Rankin - 2008
Cattle Call - 2008
Hydro-Lévesque - 2008
Negativipeg - 2010
Tabula Rasa - 2012
Mynarski Death Plummet - 2014
The Radical Expeditions of Walter Boudreau - 2015
The Tesla World Light - 2017
The Twentieth Century - 2019
Municipal Relaxation Module - 2022

References

External links

Canadian animated film directors
Canadian experimental filmmakers
Film directors from Winnipeg
McGill University alumni
Université Laval alumni
Living people
Directors of Genie and Canadian Screen Award winners for Best Animated Short
Year of birth missing (living people)